Dick Wetmore (January 13, 1927 – January 4, 2007) was an American jazz and bebop violinist. He played several musical instruments including the cornet, trumpet and string bass. Wetmore worked primarily as a sideman, but also led his own jazz ensembles.

Biography
Born Richard Byron Wetmore in Glens Falls, New York, he played the violin before entering the Army, but wished to join the Army Band and taught himself to play the cornet. He had formal musical training at the New England Conservatory of Music, but credited his improvisational skills to his period in the army.

Wetmore was a sideman in groups led by Gerry Mulligan, Charlie Parker, Billie Holiday, Sarah Vaughan and Dizzy Gillespie. His discography includes The Gerry Mulligan Songbook, in which he is part of a jazz string quartet. He also led, and recorded, with his own combos. In 1996, Wetmore performed as a jazz soloist with the Cape Cod Symphony Orchestra, where he improvised songs by George Gershwin and Jerome Kern.

Jack Chambers, a University of Toronto professor who writes about jazz, called Wetmore "a jazz chameleon with professional skills on both trumpet and violin, and equally at home playing Dixieland or bebop or cool jazz." Chambers subsequently stated about the mid-1950s album, Wetmore Plays Zieff, as "beautifully crafted, and it stands as one of the most obscure great records in modern jazz." A track from his album, Dick Wetmore (1952), was included in the Smithsonian Institution's collection of greatest jazz recordings.

Wetmore performed into the 21st century, until shortly before his death, at the age of 79, from emphysema in Indianapolis, Indiana.

Discography

As leader
 Dick Wetmore (Bethlehem, 1955)

As sideman
 Vinnie Burke, Vinnie Burke's String Jazz Quartet (ABC-Paramount, 1957)
 Gerry Mulligan, The Gerry Mulligan Songbook (Pacific Jazz 1995)
 Tony Ortega, Jazz for Young Moderns (And Old Buzzards, Too) (Bethlehem, 1959)
 Nat Pierce, Chamber Music for Moderns (Coral, 1957)

References

External links
Jazz.com Encyclopedia of Jazz Musicians
Jazzboston.org
Bethelhem Records discography

1927 births
2007 deaths
Jazz musicians from New York (state)
Musicians from New York (state)
People from Glens Falls, New York
20th-century American male musicians
20th-century American violinists
American jazz musicians
American jazz violinists
American male jazz musicians
American male violinists
Deaths from emphysema